The expansion of the land area of Lower Manhattan in New York City by land reclamation has, over time, greatly altered Manhattan Island's shorelines on the Hudson and East rivers; as well as those of the Upper New York Bay. The extension of the island began with European colonialization and continued in the 20th century.  Incremental encroachment as well as major infrastructure have added acreage to the island.  Since the passage of the Rivers and Harbors Act of 1899 all projects which extend into navigable waterways follow federal regulation and are overseen by the United States Army Corps of Engineers.

The original shoreline on the East Side generally ran along contemporary Pearl and Cherry streets and on the West Side was roughly today's Greenwich Street. Encroachment began in the 17th-century Dutch settlement of New Amsterdam. The real estate law mechanism of water lots encouraged commercial land growth through the Dongan Charter of 1686 and the Montgomerie Charter of 1731.  By the 19th century  of land had been created by landfill, the disposal of waste. By the early 20th century the expansion had obliterated the extensive oyster beds which once covered much of the estuary floor. It is estimated that by the 1970s, 1400 to 2225 acres of the entire Manhattan landmass, has been created by reclamation. Another estimate is that 3,000 acres, or 29% of the entire land area, had been created by reclamation. 

In the 21st century, largely in response to Hurricane Sandy (2012)and a lesser degree Hurricane Ida (2021) projects along the shoreline have been proposed as part of climate change adaptation to mitigate the effects to Manhattan Island by improved resilience. Lower Manhattan Coastal Resiliency programs, which involve fortifying and extending the shoreline, are being implemented.

Proposals for expansion encompassing Governors Island, which lies off the southern tip of Manhattan, have circulated since the early 20th century

The Battery

In 1683, the British built platforms of dirt off the island's southern tip for military defense, and again in 1735 as the Copsey Battery. The remains of Fort George/Amsterdam was used for expansion of the Battery in 1788. 

Castle Clinton was built on a small artificial island just off shore. Construction began in 1808 and the fort was completed in 1811, though modifications continued through the 1820s.  The Battery was mostly created by landfill starting from 1855, using earth from street-widening projects in Lower Manhattan which united Castle Garden's island with the "mainland" of Manhattan. The original shoreline is roughly the modern-day park's eastern boundary at State Street.

FDR Drive and East River Park
FDR Drive was built along the East River shore in the 1930s using embankments and pilings.

East River Park was built on landfill. In December 2019, the New York City Council voted to approve the controversial $1.45 billion East Side Coastal Resiliency (ESCR) project, involving the park's complete demolition and subsequent renovation.

Battery Park City
In the 1960s–1970s, landfill was used in the creation of  that comprise Battery Park City. The initial  utilized  cubic yards of material from excavations for the construction of the original World Trade Center Additional fill came from other construction projects such as New York City Water Tunnel and the dredging of the Kill Van Kull.

South Street-East River

The East River waterfront shifted to Water Street in 1730, Front Street in 1780, and finally, South Street in 1800.

In 2013, then-mayor Michael Bloomberg proposed a "Seaport City" similar to Battery Park City for the area around the South Street Seaport.

In 2021, the City of New York introduced the Financial District-Seaport (FidiSeaport) Resilience Plan for a  stretch of what is seen as the most complicated and vulnerable reach of shoreline in Lower Manhattan. Construction would incorporate floodwalls, floodgates, pumps, and other water management techniques to handle tidal flow, flooding and stormwater and extend  to  into the river.

Gansevoort Peninsula
Gansevoort Peninsula, located in what is now known as the Meatpacking District at the northern end of Greenwich Village, was originally a spit of land jutting into the Hudson River. The North Battery was an artillery battery built 1808–1811 in the river, connected by a bridge and jetty/breakwater to Hubert Street. Fort Gansevoort was completed in 1812 between Gansevoort Street and West 12th Street. Thirteenth Avenue was created 1837 by landfill. 

West Washington Market was created in 1887. New York City solved the problem in an unusual way by actually taking away a block of land that was the 1837 landfill that extended Manhattan to 13th Avenue. The controversial decision included condemning many businesses.  The city was unable to condemn the West Washington Street Market, which remained a landfill.   The market ultimately closed and the dock was converted to a sanitation facility that was used to load garbage barges headed for the Fresh Kills Landfill. The only section of 13th Avenue that remained was behind the sanitation facility. In 2016, the city began demolishing the Department of Sanitation building as part of a plan for the creation of a new public park on the land.Little Island at Pier 55 is just to the north.

Proposals including Governors Island

Canadian-American engineer T. Kennard Thomson first made an expansive proposal for "A Really Greater New York" in 1911, incorporating a lower Manhattan expansion into Governors Island (at that time undergoing land reclamation itself) as "New Manhattan", as well as other ambitious designs such as new Lower New York Bay islands, and filling in and creating new rivers. One of his goals was to halt the historical march uptown, which was seen as detrimental to downtown businesses. Thomson made different versions of this idea through the years, forming a "Manhattan Extension" corporation in 1921 with support from prominent former judge and presidential candidate Alton B. Parker as well as the artist Walter Russell, and continuing advocacy for the rest of his life.

A century after Thomson's initial idea, a 2011 proposal by Vishaan Chakrabarti, a professor at Columbia University's Center for Urban Real Estate, suggested using land fill to connect lower Manhattan and Governors Island, so creating a new neighborhood referred to as "LoLo" (Lower Lower Manhattan). Chakrabarti and others pointed out challenges to the proposal, which include cost, the strict regulations surrounding building with landfill, and the potential environmental effects of the project. The proposal was revisited in 2015 by author Jon Methven of The Awl, in which he referred to the proposed borough as "Frankenborough". 

A 2022 proposal along these lines by Jason Barr of Rutgers University called for a "New Mannahatta". This proposal was criticized by Willy Blackmore in Curbed on environmental grounds.

See also
Geography of New York–New Jersey Harbor Estuary
Vision 2020: New York City Comprehensive Waterfront Plan
Manhattan Waterfront Greenway#Storm barrier
Freshkills Park
New York Harbor Storm-Surge Barrier
East Shore Seawall
Billion Oyster Project
Sawing-off of Manhattan Island

References

External links
T. Kennard Thomson scrapbook NYPL Digital Collections
Watch Manhattan’s Boundaries Expand Over 250 Years

Land reclamation
Lower Manhattan
Port of New York and New Jersey
Unbuilt buildings and structures in New York City